Arturo Porro is the name of

 Arturo Porro (athlete) (1889 – 1967), Italian middle-distance runner 
 Arturo Porro (sport shooter) (born 1919), Uruguayan sports shooter